The 2015–16 season of Atromitos F.C. is the 93st in the club's history and the second consecutive season that the club will be participating in the UEFA Europa League. It will also be the eighth consecutive season that the club will be competing in Super League Greece.

Events

Important Moments
30 July:  Atromitos achieves great victory with two goals difference across AIK Solna 3–1 with goals from Napoleoni 3 minute, 15 the Marcelinho made two finishes to his team and Umbides to shape the final 1-3 European Match is play off
6 August:  Atromitos Sealed qualification with a 4-1 aggregate after winning 1–0 at primary stage by goal Marselinio 67 ' and seal qualification for the playoffs the Europa League will face Fenerbahce 's Van Persie

Current squad

Out on loan

Personnel

Management

|}

Technical staff

|}

Competitions

UEFA Europa League

Qualifying phase

Third qualifying round

Atromitos won 4–1 on aggregate.

Play-Off

Super League Greece

League table

Matches

Greek Football Cup

Group stage

Group F

Round of 16

References

2015-16
Greek football clubs 2015–16 season